Billy Abernathy (1939–2016) was an American photographer.  He was married to Laini (Sylvia) Abernathy, an artist and activist.

History 
During his lifetime he officially changed him name to Fundi. Billy (Fundi) Abernathy was associated with the AfriCOBRA.

Around the 1970s, both him and his wife Sylvia changed their names to Fundi Abernathy and Laini Abernathy with the purpose of "africanizing their name". Alongside his wife, Abernathy worked documenting African American Black culture in the South Side of Chicago. Billy (Fundi) Abernathy was associated with the AfriCOBRA, a group of black artists who worked in Chicago seeking a way of bringing light to black communities in visual arts.

Career 
Billy Abernathy collaborated on the Wall of Respect, an outdoor mural, with his wife, Sylvia. He worked alongside artists Elliott Hunter and Jeff Donaldson on the Wall's "Jazz" section as well as the "Rhythm and Blues" section. Together, they worked on creating a photograph based mural of The Wall scattered around different areas of Chicago. Abernathy was also associated with the Organization of Black American Culture (OBAC); he was one of the photographer members. 

Fundi Abernathy was one of the photographers featured in the Art Institute's 2018 exhibit "Never a Lovely So Real: Photography and Film in Chicago, 1950–1980".  One of the featured photographs of Abernathy's was "The Screen", shot in 1967. Other words found in the Art Institute of Chicago are: "Mother's Day", "The Robe", and "Chicago". In 1966, he photographed for Roscoe Mitchell Sextet's Album cover, Delmark which his wife designed. Fundi also worked on the multi media book "In Our Terribleness" with Amiri Baraka.

References 

Wikipedia Student Program
1939 births
2016 deaths
American photographers